Leif Gustafsson (born 7 October 1951) was a former Grand Prix motorcycle road racer from Sweden. His best year was in 1975, when he won the Czechoslovakian Grand Prix, and finished fourth in the 125cc world championship.

References 

1951 births
Swedish motorcycle racers
50cc World Championship riders
125cc World Championship riders
250cc World Championship riders
350cc World Championship riders
Living people